Yampolsky, Yampolsky, Yampolskiy is a toponymic surname common among Ukrainian Jews that resided in and around the places called  Yampol in Ukraine since the times of the  Russian Empire. The Lithuanized form is  Jampolskis and the Polonized form is Jampolski. 

Notable people with the surname include:

 Abram Yampolsky (1890–1956), Soviet classical violinist
 Boris Yampolsky (1912–1972), Russian writer and editor
 Miri Yampolsky, Israeli pianist
 Dela Yampolsky (born 1988), Israeli–Nigerian footballer
 Philip Yampolsky (1920–1996), American translator 
 Roman Yampolskiy (born 1979 ), Russian computer scientist
 Vladimir Yampolsky (1905–1965), Russian pianist
 Mariana Yampolsky (1925–2002), American-born Mexican photographer
 Shachar Yampolsky, Israeli keyboardist, member of Teapacks since 2014

References

Russian-language surnames
Jewish surnames
Toponymic surnames